Stephen Spinella (born October 11, 1956) is an American stage, television, and film actor.

Early life
Spinella was born in Naples, Italy, to a father who was an American naval airplane mechanic. He grew up in Glendale, Arizona, and graduated from the University of Arizona with a degree in drama. He also attended NYU's Tisch School of the Arts' Graduate Acting Program, graduating in 1982.

Spinella won consecutive Tony awards for Best Featured Actor and Best Actor in a Play for his performance as Prior Walter in Angels in America: Millennium Approaches (1993) and Angels in America: Perestroika (1994) respectively.  He was also nominated for Best Featured Actor in a Musical for James Joyce's The Dead.

Personal life
Spinella is openly gay.

Work

Stage
 April 1985:  A Bright Room Called Day – Baz (workshop production directed by Tony Kushner)
 May 4, 1993 – December 4, 1994: Angels in America: Millennium Approaches – Prior Walter/Man in Park
 November 23, 1993 – December 4, 1994: Angels in America: Perestroika – Prior Walter
 February 14, 1995 – September 17, 1995: Love! Valour! Compassion! – Perry Sellars
 December 14, 1997 – August 30, 1998: A View from the Bridge – Alfieri
 December 3, 1998 – March 21, 1999: Electra – Servant to Orestes
 January 11, 2000 – April 16, 2000: James Joyce's The Dead – Freddy Malins
 December 4, 2002 – January 26, 2003: Our Town – Simon Stimson
 December 10, 2006 – 2007: Spring Awakening – Adult Men
 May 15, 2009 – June 28, 2009: The Intelligent Homosexual's Guide to Capitalism and Socialism with a Key to the Scriptures – Pill
 October 19, 2010 – November 7, 2010: An Iliad – The Poet
 December 2, 2012 –  December 23, 2012: Volpone – Volpone
 April 21, 2014 – May 4, 2014: The Velocity of Autumn – Chris
 April 17, 2018 – July 22, 2018: Angels in America – Roy M. Cohn
 March 20, 2019 – present: Harry Potter and the Cursed Child – Vernon Dursley/Severus Snape/Lord Voldemort

Film
 1995: Virtuosity as Dr. Darrel Lindenmeyer
 1995: Tarantella as Frank
 1996: Faithful as Young Man at Rolls
 1997: The Jackal as Douglas
 1997: David Searching as Hummus Guy
 1997: Love! Valour! Compassion! as Perry Sellars
 1998: The Unknown Cyclist as Doug Stein
 1998: Great Expectations as Carter Macleish
 1998: Out of the Past as Michael Wigglesworth (voice of)
 1999: Cradle Will Rock as Donald O'Hara
 1999: Ravenous as Knox
 2001: Bubble Boy as Chicken Man
 2004: House of D as Ticket Seller
 2004: Connie and Carla as Robert/Peaches
 2007: And Then Came Love as Stuart
 2008: Stone & Ed as Concierge
 2008: Milk as Rick Stokes
 2010: Rubber as Lieutenant Chad
 2012: Lincoln as Congressman Asa Vintner Litton
 2012: House of Dust as Psychiatrist 
 2018: Can You Ever Forgive Me? as Paul
 2019: Windows on the World as Albert
 2019: Bad Education as Thomas "Tom" Tuggiero

Television
 1993: And the Band Played On as Brandy Alexander
 1997: What the Deaf Man Heard as Percy
 2000: Law & Order as Andy Polone
 2001: The Education of Max Bickford as Rex Pinsker
 2002: Alias as Mr. Kishell; Boyd Harkin  	
 2002: Ed as Bob McCarthy
 2003: Frasier as Randall Schoonover
 2004: Huff as Mr. Heard
 2005: Will & Grace as Bret
 2005: Without a Trace as Joel Kemper
 2006: Everwood as Father Patrick
 2006: 24 as Miles Papazian, 10 episodes
 2006: Heroes as Oliver Dennison
 2006: Grey's Anatomy as Malar Pascowitz
 2007: Nip/Tuck as Dr. Capler
 2008: Desperate Housewives as Dr. Heller
"You're Gonna Love Tomorrow" (5x01)
"What More Do I Need?" (5x07)
"City on Fire" (5x08)
"Everybody Says Don't" (5x23)
 2008: The Mentalist (Season 2x19) as ADA Marc Odenthal
 2009: Big Love as Eric (Season 3, Episode 4)
 2014: The Normal Heart as Sanford
 2015: The Knick as A.D. Elkins
 2018: Elementary (Season 6, Episode 10) Professor Merrick Hausmann 
 2019: Tales of the City (episode: "The Price of Oil") as Chris
 2019: The Blacklist (Season 6, Episode 9: Minister D) as Jordan Loving

References

External links
 
 
 
 Stephen Spinella Downstage Center XM radio interview by the American Theatre Wing, December 2006
 Stephen Spinella interviewed in Performance Working in the Theatre seminar video by the American Theatre Wing, September 1993

1956 births
Living people
American male film actors
American male musical theatre actors
American male television actors
American people of Italian descent
Male actors from Arizona
Drama Desk Award winners
American gay actors
People from Glendale, Arizona
Tony Award winners
University of Arizona alumni
Tisch School of the Arts alumni
20th-century American male actors
21st-century American male actors
LGBT people from Arizona